The SDI engine is a design of naturally aspirated (NA) direct injection diesel engine developed and produced by Volkswagen Group for use in cars and vans, along with marine engine (Volkswagen Marine) and Volkswagen Industrial Motor applications.

The SDI brand name (derived from "Suction Diesel Injection" or "Suction Diesel Direct Injection", the latter a literal translation of the ) was adopted in order to differentiate between earlier and less efficient indirect injection engines, called SD or "Suction Diesel", which were also produced by Volkswagen Group.

They are available in various displacements (from 1.7 to 2.5 litres), in inline-four (R4 or I4) and inline-five (R5 or I5), in various states of tune, depending on intended application.

The SDI engine is generally utilised in applications where reliability and fuel economy are of primary concern. These engines lack any type of forced induction, hence the use of 'suction' in the title, and their power output is lower than a turbocharged engine of similar displacement.

SDI engines and applications 

Notes: Volkswagen Marine engines were originally rated according to Directive 80/1269/ EEC.  However, some are now being rated to ISO 8178-4.

Lubricants 
Like their related Volkswagen Group Turbocharged Direct Injection diesel engines, Volkswagen AG requires that motor oil lubricants for SDI engines must conform to one of the officially approved standards VW505.00, 505.01, 506.00, 506.01, or 507.00. 'Generic' oil standards such as the American Petroleum Institute 'API', or European Automobile Manufacturers Association 'ACEA' are not in themselves recognised or approved by VW, although such an oil may also conform to one of the specific VW standards.

Many formulations of motor oils from most brands are now "VW Approved" to the above standards.  However some unapproved 'off brands' print the VW number on the label, implying that they meet the said standard, but hide in small type the word "recommended".  Only Volkswagen AG can grant the necessary approvals, following in-house testing.  Volkswagen Germany (and Volkswagen of America) publish up-to-date lists of currently approved oils on their respective websites, along with the technical resource, erWin.

All SDI-engined models with "LongLife Servicing", "Extended Service Intervals", "ESI", or "WIV", must be lubricated by official 'LongLife' lubricants, namely VW506.00 (for non-PD), VW506.01 (for PD), or VW507.00. According to VW 'generic' longlife lubricants, or those certified by other manufacturers such as General Motors, BMW or Mercedes-Benz should not be used.

SDI vs other VW Group diesel engines 
The following table contains a selection of current and historical Volkswagen Group compression-ignition SDI diesel engines for comparison of performance and operating characteristics with other naturally aspirated and forced induction engines of the same capacity:

References

External links 
VolkswagenAG.com – Volkswagen Group corporate website
Polkowice (Poland) Plant Sustainability site – engine plant

Volkswagen Group diesel engines
Diesel engines by model
Fuel injection systems
Marine diesel engines